Delyasar-e Olya (also Romanized as Delyāsar-e ‘Olyā) is a village in Sarfaryab Rural District, Sarfaryab District, Charam County, Kohgiluyeh and Boyer-Ahmad Province, Iran. At the 2006 census, its population was 50, in 13 families.

References 

Populated places in Charam County